A removable roof was an easily dismantled construction that protected the curtain walls, cavaliers and bastions of several early modern European fortresses. It was once believed that this construction was as old as the 12th century, but most modern historians maintain that the first removable roofs were constructed around 1550.

Medieval removable roofs 

This perspective was already being doubted by castle researcher, as "something that could be imagined as practical, but which does not always reflect reality." Piper points out, among other things, that there are no medieval sources that speak about removable roofs but several reports of sieges mentioning that enemy shells were destroying the roofs of a castle, accounts which suggest that the castles had more conventional solid roof structures.

More recent castle research also suggests that the majority of the Central European castles were not designed for large-scale sieges, but rather against minor or surprise attacks. Since most castles were not built merely to provide the military function of a fortress, but at the same time were residences of the nobility, provisional roofs are unlikely to have been normal. In addition, hardly anything is known about the roof structures of high medieval castles, since they were generally rebuilt in later times, or have not survived in the case of ruined castles.

Removable roofs in early modern fortresses 
From about 1550 onwards, however, there is historical evidence of the actual use of such roof structures in fortifications. In the sphere of influence of the Franconian free imperial city of Nuremberg some removable roofs have survived to the present or been reconstructed. Numerous corbels on the curtain walls indicate the intention to build removable roofs, but contemporary illustrations show that these plans did not come fully to fruition. A bird's eye view at the time of the Thirty Years' War (around 1630, Swedish State Archives) portrays a defensive system with removable roofs on four of the five bastions. The three cavaliers also have correspondingly open superstructures. No roofs can be seen above the curtain walls. This illustration view largely corresponds to the present state of this Renaissance fortress.

In the reconstruction of Nuremberg's city walls, that largely survived until the Second World War, several sections of the wall were re-covered in this way. The posts of the roof trusses also rest on stone columns, which jut out of the wall line or are placed on the cornices.

The history of this type of building remains largely unexplored by serious historians. In the sixteenth century, Franconian military engineers leant heavily on Italian innovations.

References

Literature 
 Daniel Burger: Festungen in Bayern. Regensburg,  2008. 

Roofs
Castle architecture